The Ndji River, or Ndgii River, Dji River, Kpéo River, is a river of the Central African Republic. It is a left tributary of the Kotto River.

Characteristics

It rises to the east of the Pata sandstone plateau and skirts the eastern escarpment before crossing it.

The Belgian explorer Léon Hanolet travelled up the valley of the Bali (Mbali) river and the upper Kotto River in 1894, following the road of the Arab caravans.
He described the country as flat, and sometimes walked for six hours without crossing a stream.

Ecology

The river is home to the Syncerus caffer aequinoctialis subspecies of the African buffalo.

Notes

Sources

Rivers of the Central African Republic